James Kent (born 1993), known by his stage name Perturbator, is a French synthwave musician from Paris.

Biography

Kent has a background as a guitarist in several black metal bands. Since 2012, he has produced electronic music inspired by cyberpunk culture and from movies such as Akira, Ghost in the Shell, and The Running Man. He uses a variety of software synths in his productions, such as the emulators of old vintage synths like the OB-X or the CS-80. Since his debut EP Night Driving Avenger he has released five full-length albums, the latest of which is Lustful Sacraments on the Blood Music label, and has performed several live shows. Several of his tracks were featured in the 2012 game Hotline Miami and its 2015 sequel Hotline Miami 2: Wrong Number. Perturbator's EP Sexualizer was released in part to officially release the song "Miami Disco" and as a way to thank the developers of Hotline Miami. The success of the Hotline Miami games resulted in a greater amount of exposure to a mainstream audience.

Perturbator released his fourth full-length album The Uncanny Valley on 6 May 2016 through Blood Music on a range of formats including Digibook CD, vinyl, and cassette tape. The album was met with generally positive reviews, with MetalSucks and Bloody Disgusting both writing in praise of it. Some versions of the album also included a bonus EP, with Kent writing that "The first three songs complement the themes covered within The Uncanny Valley, and the final track—'VERS/US'—is a demo from The Uncanny Valley writing sessions that fits the mood and atmosphere of the album but didn't quite make it into the final cut." Bloody Disgusting gave the album 5/5 and wrote that The Uncanny Valley "is sure to not only please fans of the genre but also win over newcomers."

Kent became interested in music in part due to the influence of his parents, who are journalists and rock music critics. His parents were themselves musicians and had a tech trance band when they were young, which influenced Kent to take an interest in synthesizers.

Kent also has a side project called L'Enfant De La Forêt and his own label called "Music of the Void".

In 2019 Kent appeared in the documentary film The Rise of the Synths, appearing alongside various other composers from the Synthwave scene, including filmmaker John Carpenter who also narrated the film which explored the origins and growth of the genre.

Discography
Adapted from AllMusic, SoundCloud, Bandcamp, Google Play Music, and official website.

Studio albums
 Terror 404 (May 2012, self-released; remaster released in March 2015 by Blood Music)
 I Am the Night (December 2012, self-released; remaster released in March 2015 by Blood Music)
 Dangerous Days (Perturbator album)|Dangerous Days (June 2014, Blood Music / Telefuture Records)
 The Uncanny Valley (May 2016, Blood Music)
 Lustful Sacraments (May 2021, Blood Music)

EPs
 Night Driving Avenger (March 2012, self-released; remaster released in October 2015 by Blood Music)
 Nocturne City (August 2012, Aphasia Records)
 The 80s Slasher (October 2012, Collaboration with Protector 101, Aphasia Records)
 LA Cop Duo / Selections (March 2013, Collaboration with Protector 101, Revolving Door Records)
 Sexualizer (June 2013, Aphasia Records)
 The Uncanny Valley – Bonus (May 2016, Blood Music)
 New Model (September 2017, Blood Music / Music of the Void)
 Excess EP (2021, Blood Music)

Compilations 
 B-sides and Remixes, Vol. I (November 2018, Blood Music)
 B-sides and Remixes, Vol. II (November 2018, Blood Music)

Singles
 "She Moves Like a Knife" (January 2014)
 "She Is Young, She Is Beautiful, She Is Next" (March 2015)
 "Assault" (April 2015)
 "Tactical Precision Disarray" (December 2016)
 "Vantablack" (August 2017)
 "Body/Prison" (October 2018 with HEALTH)
 "Excess" (February 2019)
 "Death of the Soul" (February 2021)
 "Dethroned Under A Funeral Haze" (April 2021)

Music videos
 "She Is Young, She Is Beautiful, She Is Next" (2014, directed by Jarkko Kinnunen & Sami Rämä)
 "Sentient" (2016, directed by Valenberg)
 "Venger" (2017, directed by David Fitt & Federico Pelat)
 "Death of the Soul" (2021, directed by Metastazis)
 "God Says" (2022, directed by Metastazis)

References

Synthwave musicians
Living people
French people of British descent
French electronic musicians
1993 births
Musicians from Paris
21st-century French male musicians
21st-century French musicians